Gemeentelijk Sportpark Tilburg was a multi-use stadium in Tilburg, Netherlands.  It was used mostly for football matches and hosted the home matches of Willem II. The stadium was able to hold 25,000 spectators at its peak.  It was closed in 1995 when Koning Willem II Stadion opened.

External links
Stadium information

Defunct football venues in the Netherlands
Sports venues in North Brabant
Willem II (football club)
Buildings and structures in Tilburg
Sport in Tilburg
Sports venues completed in 1919
Sports venues demolished in 1992